The 1969–70 season was Fussball Club Basel 1893's 76th season in their existence. It was their 24th consecutive season in the top flight of Swiss football after their promotion the season 1945–46. They played their home games in the St. Jakob Stadium.

Overview

Pre-season
Helmut Benthaus was player-manager for the fifth consecutive season. There were only a few changes in the squad. Manfred Schädler and Anton Schnyder moved on to Concordia Basel, Dieter Rüefli moved to St. Gallen and Claude Iff left the squad. Ex-German international player Stefan Reisch joined from  Club Brugge. Otherwise Benthaus relied on young players, Roland Paolucci, Rolf Riner and Janos Konrad came from the reserve team to help when needed in the first team. Basel played a total of 50 matches during this season. 26 of these games were in the domestic league, seven were in the Swiss Cup, two were in the European Cup, five were in the Cup of the Alps and 10 were friendly matches. Of these 10 test games nine were won and one ended in a defeat. Two test matches were played at home and eight played away.

Domestic league
14 teams contested in the 1969–70 Nationalliga A. These were the top 12 teams from the previous 1968–69 season and the two newly promoted teams Wettingen and Fribourg. The championship was played in a double round robin, the last two teams at the end of the season to be relegated. Basel played a good season. Despite a bad run with four defeats in eight games between the end of September and the beginning of December, they won 11 of the last 14 games during the second half of the season. Basel won the championship a point clear of Lausanne Sports who ended in second position and three points ahead of FC Zürich who finished third. Basel won 15 of the 26 games, drawing seven, losing four times, they scored 59 goals conceding 23. Helmut Hauser was the team's top goal scorer with 14 league goals and Walter Balmer second top scorer with 12 league goals.

Swiss Cup
On 14 September 1969 Basel started in the Swiss Cup in the round of 32 with a 10–0 home win against Minerva Bern (as result of merger later renamed Breitenrain Bern). In the round of 16 played on 12 October Basel had a home match against Grenchen which was won 3–2. In the quarter-final, played in November, Basel had a two legged tie against Xamax-Sports NE (later renamed Neuchâtel Xamax). This was won 7–2 on aggregate. The semi-final was also a two legged tie and this against Servette Genève. Basel won both legs and 6–1 on aggregate. The final was played on 18 May 1970 in the Wankdorf Stadium, but was lost against Zürich after extra time.

European Cup and Cup of the Alps
In the European Cup Basel were drawn against Scottish club Celtic. The first leg, which played on 17 September 1969 in the St. Jakob Stadium in front of 37,587 spectators, ended in a goalless draw. The return leg on 1 October in Celtic Park attracted 49,976 spectators. Celtic won the game 2–0 and advanced to the next round. In the 1969 Cup of the Alps Basel won their group and in the final they beat Bologna 3–1.

Players 

 

 
 
 

 
 

 

 
 
 
 
 

 
 

Players who left the squad

Results 
Legend

Friendly matches

Pre-season and mid-season

Winter break and mid-season

Nationalliga

League matches

League standings

Swiss Cup
Round of 32

Round of 16

Quarter-final

Basel won 7 – 2 on aggregate.

Semi-final

Basel won 6 – 1 on aggregate.

Final

Zürich won 4–1 after extra time.

European Cup

First round

Celtic won 2–0 on aggregate.

Coppa delle Alpi

Group B matches 

NB: teams did not play compatriots; Waregem did not play Eintracht

Group B table

Final 
The Final was played in St. Jakob Stadium, Basel, between the winners of both groups.

See also
 History of FC Basel
 List of FC Basel players
 List of FC Basel seasons

References

Sources 
 Rotblau: Jahrbuch Saison 2017/2018. Publisher: FC Basel Marketing AG. 
 Die ersten 125 Jahre. Publisher: Josef Zindel im Friedrich Reinhardt Verlag, Basel. 
 Verein "Basler Fussballarchiv" Homepage
 Switzerland 1969–70 at RSSSF
 Cup of the Alps 1969 at RSSSF

External links
 FC Basel official site

FC Basel seasons
Basel
1969-70